Skinner's Case became a constitutionally important dispute between the House of Lords and the House of Commons over the question of any original jurisdiction of the former house in civil suits (whether a possible court of first instance). Through royal intervention, it was determined and became custom that such jurisdiction was to be avoided.

Facts
In 1668, a London-based merchant, Thomas Skinner, presented a petition to Charles II asserting that he could not obtain any redress against the East India Company, which, he asserted, had injured his property, his free trading base in the Indian Ocean set up before the latter had an official monopoly.

The case was referred to the House of Lords, and Skinner obtained a verdict for £5,000 damages. The company complained to the House of Commons which declared that the proceedings in the other House were illegal. The Lords defended their action, and after two conferences between the Houses had produced no result the Commons ordered Skinner to be put in prison on a charge of breach of privilege; to this the Lords replied by fining and imprisoning Sir Samuel Barnardiston, the chairman of the company.

Then for about a year the dispute slumbered, but it was renewed in 1669, when Charles II advised the two Houses to stop all proceedings and to erase all mention of the case from their records. This was done and since this time the House of Lords has tacitly abandoned all claim to original jurisdiction (be a court of first instance) in civil suits.

Authorities
Lord Holles, The Grand Question concerning the Judicature of the House of Peers (1669)
Thomas Pitt Taswell-Langmead, English Constitutional History (1905)
Luke Owen Pike, Constitutional History of the House of Lords (1894)
Henry Hallam, Constitutional History, vol. iii. (1885).

See also
Judicial Committee of the House of Lords
Earl of Oxford's Case, in which the monarch intervened, helping to establish whether conflicting matters of equity or of those of the common law prevail in English Law.

1668 in England
1668 in law
House of Commons of the United Kingdom
House of Lords cases